Berneray or Bernera is the name of several Scottish islands:

Bernera
There are three islands called Bernera:
Bernera Island, a tidal island off the south-west coast of Lismore
Great Bernera on the north-west coast of Lewis
Little Bernera to the north of Great Bernera

Berneray
There are two islands named Berneray in the Outer Hebrides of Scotland:
Barra Head, the southernmost isle of the Outer Hebrides (also known as Berneray)
Berneray (North Uist), near North Uist. Under the parish of Harris and owned as part of the Bays of Harris Estate.